Trochocarpa clarkei, commonly known as lilac berry, is a rare flowering plant in the family Ericaceae. It is endemic to sub-alpine areas of Victoria in Australia. It is a shrub which grows to around 30 cm high. The flowers are maroon with a greenish base. The fruits, which appear in autumn, are about 8 mm in diameter. These are eaten by small mammals and birds. The species occurs in subalpine areas of the southern highlands, often in association with Eucalyptus pauciflora.

The species was formally described in 1855 by Victorian Government Botanist Ferdinand von Mueller in  his paper Definitions of rare or hitherto undescribed Australian plants. Mueller gave it the name Decaspora clarkei based on plant material collected from "shady ravines" at Mount Wellington in Gippsland. In 1867 Mueller transferred the species to the genus Trochocarpa.

References

External links
Herbarium specimen at Royal Botanic Gardens, Kew

clarkei
Ericales of Australia
Flora of Victoria (Australia)
Taxa named by Ferdinand von Mueller